Copelatus royi is a species of diving beetle. It is part of the genus Copelatus in the subfamily Copelatinae of the family Dytiscidae. It was described by Legros in 1958.

References

royi
Beetles described in 1958